Neeressa sagada is a moth of the subfamily Arctiinae. It was described by Georg Semper in 1898. It is found on Luzon in the Philippines.

References

 

Arctiinae
Moths described in 1898